Kim Seong-yoon (also transliterated as Kim Sung-yoon, born February 2, 1999) is a South Korean professional baseball outfielder for the Samsung Lions of the KBO League. He is 4 in (20 cm) shorter than the average players in KBO and tied with Daichi Mizuguchi of Seibu Lions to be the shortest among Major League Baseball (MLB), Nippon Professional Baseball (NPB) and KBO players.

Career

Samsung Lions 
Kim joined the Samsung Lions as a fourth round, 39th overall draft pick in 2017, right after graduating from Posco High School. In his sixth KBO game, against the SK Wyverns, Kim hit a two-run home run despite never hitting any home run in his high school career.

External links 
Career statistics and player information from the KBO League

References 

1999 births
KBO League outfielders
Living people
Samsung Lions players
South Korean baseball players